The Mega Society is a high IQ society open to people who have scored at the one-in-a-million level on a test of general intelligence claimed to be able to discriminate at that level. It was founded in 1982 by Ronald K. Hoeflin to facilitate psychometric research.

The public profile of the Mega Society increased with the publication of the Mega Test in 1985 by Hoeflin.

Criteria for acceptance

No professionally designed and validated IQ test claims to distinguish test-takers at the one-in-a-million level of rarity of score. The standard score range of the Stanford-Binet IQ test is 40 to 160. The standard scores on most other currently normed IQ tests fall in the same range. A score of 160 corresponds to a rarity of about 1 person in 30,000 (leaving aside the issue of error of measurement common to all IQ tests), which falls short of the Mega Society's 1 in a million requirement. IQ scores above this level are dubious as there are insufficient normative cases upon which to base a statistically justified rank-ordering. High IQ scores are less reliable than IQ scores nearer to the population median.

The Mega Society accepts members on the basis of untimed, unsupervised IQ tests that the test author claims have been normalized using standard statistical methods. There is controversy about whether these tests have been properly validated. The Mega test specifically is described as a "nonstandardized test" by a psychologist who wrote a 2012 book on the history of IQ testing.

The Guinness Book of World Records once stated that the most elite ultra High IQ Society is the Mega Society with percentiles of 99.9999 or one in a million required for admission.

Publications
The society's journal, called Noesis since July 1987, has been published since January 1982, when it was called the Circle. Currently, the journal is published on an irregular basis.

References

External links

Mega Society history

Organizations established in 1982
High-IQ societies
1982 establishments in California
Organizations based in California